Shabat Daurovich Logua (born 22 March 1995) is a Russian football midfielder who plays with the Abkhazia national football team.

Club career
Born in Sukhum, in Abhazia, Georgia he started playing at FC Tolyatti and Konoplyov football academy. He debuted as senior playing in the Tolyatti reserves team at fourth level in 2011 and 2012. In 2014 he played with Lada-Tolyatti and PFC Sochi reserves team.

In 2015 he returned to hs birthplace and played with Nart Sukhum until 2019, with the exception being a season in 2016–17 that he played with Lefke TSK in KTFF Süper Lig from Northern Cyprus.

In summer 2019 he returned to Russia where, after spending a short time with FC Tyumen, he joined the main team. During winter-break he moved abroad to Serbia and joined OFK Bačka playing in the Serbian First League where he joined another Abkhazian international, Daur Chanba. Bačka got promoted in summer 2020, and Logua stayed in the club with the difference being also the change of his shirt number from 17 to 7.

References

1993 births
Living people
Sportspeople from Sukhumi
Russian people of Abkhazian descent
Abkhazian sportspeople
Russian footballers
Association football midfielders
FC Tyumen players
OFK Bačka players
FK Zlatibor Čajetina players
Serbian First League players
Serbian SuperLiga players
Russian expatriate footballers
Expatriate footballers in Northern Cyprus
Expatriate footballers in Serbia